Sir Robert Graham Stephens (14 July 193112 November 1995) was a leading English actor in the early years of Britain's Royal National Theatre.  He was one of the most respected actors of his generation and was at one time regarded as the natural successor to Laurence Olivier.

Early life and career
Stephens was born in Shirehampton, Bristol, in 1931, the eldest of three children of shipyard labourer and costing surveyor Reuben Stephens (19051985) and chocolate-factory worker Gladys Millicent (née Deverill; 19061975). When aged 18, he won a scholarship to Esme Church's Bradford Civic Theatre School in Yorkshire, where he met his first wife Nora, a fellow student. His first professional engagement was with the Caryl Jenner Mobile Theatre, which he followed in 1951 by a year of more challenging parts in repertory at the Royalty Theatre, Morecambe, followed by seasons of touring and at the Hippodrome, Preston. The London director Tony Richardson saw a performance at the Royalty and this led to an offer of a place in the "momentous" first season of English Stage Company at the Royal Court in 1956. His success was assured.

He appeared in two versions of Epitaph for George Dillon on Broadway during the 1958-59 season for which he received a nomination for the Tony Award for Best Actor in a Play.

His early films included A Taste of Honey (1961), Cleopatra (1963) and The Prime of Miss Jean Brodie (1969) with his then wife Maggie Smith. There was also a minor role as Prince Escalus in Franco Zeffirelli's Romeo and Juliet (1968), as well as a starring role in Billy Wilder's The Private Life of Sherlock Holmes (1970) and the gothic horror film The Asphyx (1972).

Stephens played Atahuallpa in the original 1964 National Theatre production of The Royal Hunt of the Sun. He and Smith appeared together on stage and in film, notably in The Recruiting Officer at the Old Vic and the film version of The Prime of Miss Jean Brodie in 1969. However, following his departure from the National Theatre in 1970 and the break-up of their marriage in 1973, he suffered a career slump, not helped by heavy drinking and a breakdown.

Although he continued to work on stage (notably in the National Theatre's The Mysteries in 1986), film (The Fruit Machine in 1988—titled Wonderland in the US—and Kenneth Branagh's Henry V), and television (notably in the role of Abner Brown in the 1984 BBC TV dramatisation of the children's classic The Box of Delights and as the Master of an Oxford college in an episode of Inspector Morse), it was not until the 1990s that he re-established himself at the forefront of his profession, when the Royal Shakespeare Company invited him to play Falstaff in Henry IV for director Adrian Noble (opening April 1991), the title roles in Julius Caesar (director Stephen Pimlott) later in the year and then King Lear, again for Noble, in May 1993. He was awarded the Laurence Olivier Theatre Award in 1993 for Best Actor, for his performance as Falstaff.

Stephens provided the voice of Aragorn in the 1981 BBC Radio serialisation of The Lord of the Rings. In 1985, he directed the British premiere production of Danny and the Deep Blue Sea by John Patrick Shanley at the Gate Theatre, London.

Stephens was knighted as a Knight Bachelor in the 1995 New Years Honours List "For services to Drama".

Personal life
Stephens was married four times: 
 1951: to Nora Ann Simmons; they had one child, Michael Stephens, and divorced in 1952.
 1956: to Tarn Bassett; they had a daughter, Lucy, and divorced in 1967
 1967: to Maggie Smith; they had two sons, the actors Chris Larkin and Toby Stephens, and divorced in 1975.
1995: to Belfast-born Patricia Quinn (Lady Stephens; born 28 May 1944).

Death
Following years of ill health, he died on 12 November 1995 at the age of 64 due to complications during surgery, eleven months after having been knighted.

Filmography

Film

Television

References

Bibliography
 Stephens, Robert; Coveney, Michael. (1995). Knight Errant. Hodder and Stoughton
 Stevens, Christopher. (2010). Born Brilliant: The Life of Kenneth Williams. John Murray
 McFarlane, Brian. (2005). The Encyclopaedia of British Film. Methuen, 2nd edition

External links

Robert Stephens at screenonline
Portraits of Stephens at the National Portrait Gallery

1931 births
1995 deaths
Actors awarded knighthoods
English male film actors
English male stage actors
English male television actors
English male radio actors
English male voice actors
Knights Bachelor
Laurence Olivier Award winners
Royal Shakespeare Company members
Male actors from Bristol
20th-century English male actors
People from Shirehampton